Platyctenidae is a family of ctenophores belonging to the order Platyctenida.

Formerly, Tjalfiella Mortensen was classified in this family
but appears now to be a member of ist own family Tjalfiellidae.
World Register of Marine Species (WoRMS) does not list any (remaining) members of the family (as of Nov. 2021), though indicating it as validly published. Therefore it remains unclear if Platyctenidae might be a synonym of Tjalfiellidae.

References

Tentaculata